Shudra: The Rising is a 2012 Indian Hindi-language film with a partly-fictional storyline based on the caste system in ancient India, and more specifically the Hindu Varna system. It is directed by Sanjiv Jaiswal and dedicated to Dr B. R. Ambedkar.

Most of the movie was shot in the jungles on the outskirts of Lucknow.

Plot 
Shudra: The Rising is set in the time of the Indus Valley civilization and has a storyline that concerns the caste system of ancient India.

The film depicts the four basic units of the caste system - the Brahmins, Kshatriyas, Vaishyas and the Shudras. The initial part narrates the arrival of the people of west Asia to India. They were of the Aryan race and they take over the local tribe and start controlling them. Finally a learned scholar, Manu Rishi, creates a caste system which classifies the local population as Shudras, who then suffer from cruel social rules. They are suppressed and exploited at every level of their lives by the upper caste people. The film shows various rules imposed on the Shudras such as walking with a bell around their ankles and a long leaf behind their back, and a pot hanging around their neck.

Reception 
In October 2012, two Hindutva organisations - Vishwa Hindu Parishad and Bajrang Dal - demanded that the film not be shown. They claimed that its portrayal would foment rivalry between castes and that its depiction of events was anachronistic.

References

External links 
 
 

2010s Hindi-language films
Cultural depictions of B. R. Ambedkar
Films shot in India
2012 films
Films about the caste system in India